Anthony 'Tony' Sullivan (born 18 January 1949) is a former Australian rules footballer who played for Melbourne in the VFL during the 1970s.

Sullivan played as a defender and was an important member of the Melbourne team in what was an unsuccessful era for the club. He made his debut in 1967 but never really established himself in the side until the 1970s. The 1979 season was his last in the VFL.

Statistics

|- style="background-color: #EAEAEA"
! scope="row" style="text-align:center" | 1967
|
| 43 || 2 || 0 || 0 || 1 || 0 || 1 || 0 ||  || 0.0 || 0.0 || 1.0 || 0.0 || 1.0 || 0.0 || 
|- 
! scope="row" style="text-align:center" | 1968
|
| 4 || 6 || 0 || 0 || 64 || 4 || 68 || 8 ||  || 0.0 || 0.0 || 10.7 || 0.7 || 11.3 || 1.3 || 
|- style="background-color: #EAEAEA"
! scope="row" style="text-align:center" | 1969
|
| 4 || 17 || 0 || 0 || 177 || 12 || 189 || 51 ||  || 0.0 || 0.0 || 10.4 || 0.7 || 11.1 || 3.0 || 
|- 
! scope="row" style="text-align:center" | 1970
|
| 4 || 22 || 1 || 1 || 317 || 17 || 334 || 86 ||  || 0.0 || 0.0 || 14.4 || 0.8 || 15.2 || 3.9 || 
|- style="background-color: #EAEAEA"
! scope="row" style="text-align:center" | 1971
|
| 4 || 21 || 0 || 0 || 277 || 24 || 301 || 84 ||  || 0.0 || 0.0 || 13.2 || 1.1 || 14.3 || 4.0 || 
|- 
! scope="row" style="text-align:center" | 1972
|
| 4 || 18 || 0 || 0 || 230 || 22 || 252 || 61 ||  || 0.0 || 0.0 || 12.8 || 1.2 || 14.0 || 3.4 || 
|- style="background-color: #EAEAEA"
! scope="row" style="text-align:center" | 1973
|
| 4 || 21 || 0 || 2 || 262 || 47 || 309 || 81 ||  || 0.0 || 0.1 || 12.5 || 2.2 || 14.7 || 3.9 || 
|- 
! scope="row" style="text-align:center" | 1974
|
| 4 || 18 || 0 || 0 || 266 || 74 || 340 || 57 ||  || 0.0 || 0.0 || 14.8 || 4.1 || 18.9 || 3.2 || 
|- style="background-color: #EAEAEA"
! scope="row" style="text-align:center" | 1975
|
| 4 || 15 || 0 || 0 || 183 || 24 || 207 || 47 ||  || 0.0 || 0.0 || 12.2 || 1.6 || 13.8 || 3.1 || 
|- 
! scope="row" style="text-align:center" | 1976
|
| 4 || 15 || 0 || 0 || 202 || 20 || 222 || 48 ||  || 0.0 || 0.0 || 13.5 || 1.3 || 14.8 || 3.2 || 
|- style="background-color: #EAEAEA"
! scope="row" style="text-align:center" | 1977
|
| 4 || 18 || 0 || 1 || 228 || 41 || 269 || 50 ||  || 0.0 || 0.1 || 12.7 || 2.3 || 14.9 || 2.8 || 
|- 
! scope="row" style="text-align:center" | 1978
|
| 4 || 11 || 0 || 0 || 103 || 39 || 142 || 25 ||  || 0.0 || 0.0 || 9.4 || 3.5 || 12.9 || 2.3 || 
|- style="background-color: #EAEAEA"
! scope="row" style="text-align:center" | 1979
|
| 4 || 7 || 0 || 0 || 89 || 29 || 118 || 18 ||  || 0.0 || 0.0 || 12.7 || 4.1 || 16.9 || 2.6 || 
|- class="sortbottom"
! colspan=3| Career
! 191
! 1
! 4
! 2399
! 353
! 2752
! 616
! 
! 0.0
! 0.0
! 12.6
! 1.8
! 14.4
! 3.2
! 
|}

References

External links

1949 births
Living people
Australian rules footballers from Victoria (Australia)
Melbourne Football Club players